Bissell is an unincorporated community in Clear Lake Township, Sangamon County, Illinois, United States. Bissell is located on Illinois Route 54 and the Canadian National Railway near the northeast border of Springfield.

References

Unincorporated communities in Sangamon County, Illinois
Unincorporated communities in Illinois